is a Japanese ice hockey player for Obihiro Ladies and the Japanese national team.

She represented Japan at the 2019 IIHF Women's World Championship. She represented Japan at the 2023 Winter World University Games, winning a silver medal.

Her sister, Aoi Shiga, also plays on the Japanese national team.

References

External links

2001 births
Living people
Japanese women's ice hockey forwards
Ice hockey players at the 2022 Winter Olympics
Olympic ice hockey players of Japan
Universiade medalists in ice hockey
Medalists at the 2023 Winter World University Games
Universiade silver medalists for Japan